and  are two interconnected fictional characters in Soulcalibur, a series of fighting games by Namco. Introduced as a tragic hero in the 1995 game Soul Edge, Siegfried has been a mainstay and lead character for most of the series, especially Soulcalibur Legends, until Soulcalibur V. Nightmare is an evil, mutated form of Siegfried that later becomes an entity entirely separated from Siegfried in Soulcalibur III onward, the living incarnation of Soul Edge / .

Siegfried is a young German knight that, driven mad after unknowingly killing his father, becomes possessed by the evil sword Soul Edge and physically transforms into the demon known as Nightmare. Though Siegfried does temporarily regain his sanity after Nightmare is defeated by Xianghua in Soulcalibur (only to be taken over by Soul Edge again shortly after), it is not until after the events of Soulcalibur II that he is freed from the sword's control entirely and went on to pierce the cursed sword using Soul Calibur. He then seeks atonement for the atrocities he committed as Nightmare. In their final confrontation in Soulcalibur IV, Siegfried successfully destroyed Soul Edge and freed himself from the evil power.

Nightmare first appeared in one of the possible endings for the Siegfried character in Soul Edge. In the sequel Soulcalibur, he was given a name and featured as a central character. Ever since then, Nightmare has been the owner of the powerful evil sword Soul Edge, and thus the objective of most other characters in the story. Appearing in every game of the series, Nightmare has served as a recurring antagonist in contrast to the protagonist role played by Siegfried, as well as serving as Siegfried's archenemy.

Appearances

Soul games 

In his Soul Edge debut, Siegfried is a 16-year-old former child of Frederick Schtauffen, a brave knight in the Holy Roman Empire of the German Nation following the Italian Wars. Named by his mother after the legendary Germanic hero Sigurd, Siegfried had joined a band of brigands called the Schwarzwind after his father has had left on a foreign crusade, only to unintentionally kill his own returning father during an ambush. Driven insane by this act, Siegfried convinced himself that someone else was to blame for his father's death, thus embarking on a journey to find the legendary weapon known as Soul Edge and use it to take revenge.

He traveled first to Ostrheinsburg Castle belonging to the noble Stefan, who he believed to be the possessor of Soul Edge; and he joined in its forces as a Landsknecht, rising in its ranks with the hopes of acquiring Stefan's blade. During a siege on the castle, Siegfried saw an opportunity to kill Stefan, running off with his prized possession into the Black Woods, but the sword held no power. Frustrated, he continued to search for the real Soul Edge, growing increasingly more insane for its power as time passed. He finally managed to come across the real Soul Edge, lying beside the corpse of the corrupted pirate Cervantes de Leon that lit up in a hellish blaze of fire and attacked him. Siegfried raised his mighty zweihänder and defeated his lingering spirit, the fiery demon Inferno, breaking his sword in the process and earning the right to wield the Soul Edge for himself. But at the moment that Siegfried obtained the cursed blade, the Evil Seed emanated from him in a beam of light that rained across the entire world, leading only to death and destruction. Soul Edge tempted Siegfried to wield it with a promise to resurrect his dead father in exchange for gathering souls for its consumption. Not knowing that he is just being used, Siegfried agreed and started killing people to gather souls. Eventually, Soul Edge consumed him and Nightmare is born, transforming him into the Azure Knight.

In Soulcalibur Legends, Siegfried is saved from the Evil Seed by a group sent by the Masked Emperor to investigate it. Once brought to him, the Emperor requested that he resurrect Soul Edge to defeat the Ottoman Sultan Barbaros, who wielded Soul Calibur. The Emperor reminded the reluctant Siegfried of his father - who lived in the Empire's service and died protecting it - and he finally accepted the request, starting a journey alongside Ivy Valentine and court jester Iska Farkas. Siegfried travels around the world, gathering Soul Edge's shards and receiving help from Sophitia, Astaroth, Mitsurugi, Taki and Lloyd Irving, eventually forming a bond with them, despite the fact that they all wish to either take Soul Edge away from him or destroy it. Along the way, Siegfried manages to defeat several Guardians of the Soul Edge shards and restore Soul Edge's power. Using it, Siegfried defeats Barbaros. The Masked Emperor gets Soul Calibur and reveals that she planned to defend her people by annihilating all possible enemies with the combined powers of it and Soul Edge. However, she is unsuccessful in seizing Soul Edge from Siegfried, and an event seemingly similar to the Evil Seed takes place during their battle. He defeats Inferno when the demon tries to stop him in the form of Nightmare and succeeds in sealing Soul Edge, replacing it with the sword Requiem. Siegfried saves his allies, and together they march against the Empire's army. He confronts and defeats the Masked Emperor and stop her conquest. As he leaves her, Soul Calibur, and Soul Edge behind, Iska betrays him and takes both swords but Siegfried emerges victorious. As Iska dies he exclaims that in the end, all will betray Siegfried and that only those with power will prevail in the end, leaving those without it to suffer and ultimately die. As Siegfried leaves, he takes the unsealed Soul Edge with him again.

In Soulcalibur, his group of followers (Astaroth, Aeon Calcos, and Ivy) aided him in Soul Edge's quest to devour souls for a resurrection ceremony to be performed in his chosen stronghold, Ostrheinsburg. But as the ceremony was about to take place, both Aeon Calcos and Astaroth have been defeated, and Ivy had left after learning the truth of her past from Taki. Two young warriors confronted Nightmare: Kilik and Xianghua. After a raging battle, the evil sword shattered and Siegfried regained some of his humanity and managed to briefly break free from Soul Edge's control. But along came the memories of the sins he committed when he was consumed by Soul Edge. Moreover, he realized that he had been the one who murdered his father and that his "resurrection" was only an illusion brought by his mind. Siegfried meditated on all he had done and decided that if he was to be successful in his new resolve, he must distance himself from the civilized society so that he never kills again. He could not see his mother until he was fully redeemed.

By Soulcalibur II, the balance between the restored Soul Edge and Siegfried was broken, and Soul Edge was able to take over Siegfried's mind. He has been well aware that although he had regained his sanity and learned to accept his past sins, he was not yet fully redeemed. At first, it was for short periods of time during his sleep, but eventually, he took Siegfried's body completely and used him to cause destruction once more. Four years passed, as he had assumed the azure armor for a second time, becoming Nightmare all over again, desperately pursuing fragments of the Soul Edge that he might fully restore it. As Nightmare plundered powerful souls and recovered shattered fragments, the cracks in Soul Edge healed one by one. His goal nearing completion, Nightmare returned to Ostrheinsburg for the restoration of the evil sword's true power. Raphael Sorel, a French former-nobleman pursuing the blade for his own scheme, challenged Nightmare and was completely defeated, but managed to pierce Soul Edge's eye with his rapier in one final attack when Siegfried's will awakened and he struggled to free his mind from the influence of evil. The sword now in agony lost control over Siegfried and allowed him to defeat Inferno and break free once again. Siegfried then discovered Soul Calibur, released from Inferno's body after its defeat, and impaled Soul Edge's eye with it. Both swords sealed, Siegfried abandoned his old armor and left with them, swearing to seal away Soul Edge for all eternity and atone for his sins.

His fate would not release him so easily, however. In Soulcalibur III, Zasalamel revived "Nightmare" in essence. Created as an avatar for a disembodied Inferno using the original armor as a shell, he pursued and eventually recovered his true body, Soul Edge. Nightmare also met Tira, who became his servant and manipulated others into protecting Soul Edge and sacrificing souls for Nightmare, to eventually become sacrifices themselves. Meanwhile, Zasalamel manipulated Siegfried, leading him to Nightmare, and wielding Soul Calibur, he clashed against Soul Edge. At the moment the swords struck a burst of energy was released; Siegfried was mortally wounded, while Soul Edge and its body were pulled into a warped dimension, eventually returning to Ostrheinsburg.

In Soulcalibur IV, Soul Calibur revived Siegfried, while Inferno restored Soul Edge fully and strengthened his hold over the animated armor that was Nightmare. Inferno then claimed the entire city of Ostrheinsburg as a vessel due to the fact that Nightmare lacked the capacity to contain his consciousness, and as a result, the city became cursed and many of its inhabitants were corrupted. Tira continued serving Nightmare and manipulating Astaroth, Sophitia and others into serving Soul Edge, in order to weaken Soul Calibur and provide Nightmare with the strength necessary to destroy the spirit sword. Nightmare would then clash against Siegfried in a final duel, though his plans have interfered with the appearance of Algol and the Tower of Remembrance. In the end, Siegfried and Nightmare fought one last climactic battle in Astral Chaos, Siegfried emerging victorious and destroying Soul Edge and Nightmare.

As revealed in Soulcalibur V, Siegfried gathered his staunchest allies from the Schwarzwind, having reformed the bandits into mercenaries, including Hildegard von Krone and Viola. One day, after more than a decade of service protecting humanity from the malfested, Siegfried discovered that Soul Calibur had transformed into a new one-handed sword—a clear harbinger of Soul Edge's return. A new champion to wield Soul Calibur would need to be found and the now 40-year-old Siegfried assigned the task to the young Z.W.E.I., a wandering swordsman who had joined his group. Meanwhile, Soul Edge regained consciousness with what little pieces of it were found and collected by its servants; allowing Nightmare to gain a new body and assume the alias of Graf Dumas. From there, Dumas worked his way into the grace of the Holy Roman Emperor Rudolf II to be awarded the Kingdom of Hungary, exploiting the war with the Ottomans to initiate a widespread search to find the remaining fragments to restore Soul Edge to its former glory, while simultaneously wanted to consume more souls under the guise of massacring the "malfested", the cursed sword's minions. Unknown to him, however, his former servant, Tira had been working to create a new Nightmare as she is not satisfied with Dumas. One of his soldiers, Patroklos Alexander; whom he manipulated for the massacre in exchange for searching his twin sister Pyrrha, revolted and fled from service. Dumas eventually met with Patroklos and Pyrrha again; this time revealing himself as Nightmare and forced Pyrrha's hidden Soul Edge power to consume her, causing Patroklos to abandon her. Nightmare then initiated a war throughout Europe with his newfound power but is eventually struck down and killed by Z.W.E.I., whom he previously tried to hunt before. Though after Pyrrha Omega kills Z.W.E.I., Inferno made her his new host for Soul Edge, but was eventually defeated by Patrokalos and together the twin siblings use Soul Edge to Piece Soul Calibur and sealing them back into the Astral Chaos.

Siegfried also appeared playable in Soulcalibur: Lost Swords, where he is 40-years-old.

Soulcalibur VI serves as a rebooted timeline after the events of Soulcalibur V, immediately taking place at the beginning of the second Soul game's reboot storyline, the original Soulcalibur, rather than the beginning of Soul Edge. Shortly after becoming Nightmare, Siegfried slaughters thousands of innocents in an attempt to resurrect his father, with Soul Edge mimicking Frederick's voice to manipulate Siegfried. Nightmare is eventually defeated by Kilik and Xianghua. After the Azure Knight's defeat, Siegfried reawakens in a nearby forest wracked with guilt over his memories of his atrocities as Nightmare and his role in his father's death. After facing off against multiple people who want revenge on him for Nightmare's crimes, his soul is partially purified by Sophitia, giving him the motivation to take down Soul Edge for good. After hearing the voice of Soul Calibur cry for help, he grips Soul Edge and becomes Nightmare once more to prevent Soul Edge from consuming Soul Calibur. He then waits for his chance to properly regain control of his body once more. Despite knowing what Soul Edge has been doing with his body while his soul is resting at nighttime, Siegfried gains the knowledge of where Soul Edge and “his” servants held their hostages are, entrusting some fellow opposing warriors like a now Korean taoist swordsman Hwang Seong-Gyeong the locations.

Other appearances 
Outside of the Soul series, Nightmare appeared in Seme COM Dungeon: Drururuaga where the player can obtain him as an "ally" and use his armor along with Soul Edge. Soul Edge also appeared as an enemy in Namco x Capcom where its shards became Charade and was fought as enemies, and made a cameo in Retro Game Challenge. A Sackboy costume of Nightmare was released as a DLC for LittleBigPlanet 3.

In 2000, Epoch C-Works released a series of action figures based upon the original Soulcalibur, amongst them Nightmare. The semi-posable figure came with equipable weapons from the title in the same package. In 2003, Todd McFarlane Productions released a Nightmare sculpture amongst a set of five based on characters from Soulcalibur II. The immobile figure was modeled after his primary outfit and stood six inches tall with a base. 

Siegfried and Nightmare both appear in Soulcalibur manga and make a guest appearance as cards in a mobile video game Outcast Odyssey and in many cards in Universal Fighting System. They are also both featured on the official Soulcalibur VI arcade stick.

Design and gameplay 
In his debut, Siegfried appeared as a young man with short blond hair and blue eyes, covered in simple knight armor. Following his redemption in Soulcalibur and beyond, he retains the armor but his hair has grown longer, past shoulder length. During Soulcalibur" he also gains a long scar dashing over his right eye. In Soulcalibur III, he returns with armor bearing the motif of a phoenix as well as feathers on his pauldrons. As of Soulcalibur IV, his armor remains the same, but a second layer of crystalline armor covers with an intricate design and wields Soul Calibur instead of Requiem. He also gains a long blue scarf as well, completing the 'knight in shining armor' visage. His weapon in Soul Edge was originally Faust, a simple zweihander (two-handed sword) with a basic design, but swapped it for Requiem, a large blade with a flat end and a black lining in the center. He continues to use this sword from Soulcalibur all the way to Soulcalibur III and resumes its use in Soulcalibur V. In Soulcalibur V, Siegfried's appearance begins to take on the traits of his father, and has grown a stubble. His hair is swept up with a couple bangs hanging down and his scar still remains. In all games, he is left-handed.

Usually a standalone character, Siegfried is an unlockable character in Soulcalibur. In Soulcalibur II, he only appears as Nightmare's alternate costumes. The 2P costume is Siegfried mid-transition into Nightmare, featuring his human form with a grotesque dragon-like arm, a golden right eye and ruined armor based on his Soulcalibur design. Nightmare's bonus costume is Siegfried in standard platemail without any mutations to his body.

Even though Nightmare originally debuted in Soulcalibur, its predecessor, Soul Edge, featured a prototype of his character. In the home version, an extra character named "Siegfried!" (an alternate version of normal Siegfried taken from his no-input ending, where he was consumed by the cursed sword Soul Edge) was added as an unlockable character. This early version has crimson armor and a more flesh-like design, almost as if he were part of Soul Edge itself; he has no story nor ending, and only used Siegfried's Soul Edge without effects. Nightmare has appeared as a playable character in all the main sequels to Soulcalibur, visually different for each game.

Siegfried's blade is powerful and has long range, but it has a slow swing. In addition to standard attacks, Siegfried fights with multiple stances. This allows him to mix up his attacks, allowing him to play mind games with his opponent. Mastering the stance changes will allow the player to maintain control over the battle and perform damaging combos against the opponent. 1UP.com recommended Siegfried in Soulcalibur IV for both beginners and experts of the series due to his easy combos despite his slow movements.

Nightmare's moveset before the events of Soulcalibur III was nearly identical to Siegfried's (barring a couple of exclusive moves in each moveset). However, Nightmare's fighting style was altered after Siegfried was freed from Inferno's influence between Soulcalibur II and Soulcalibur III. Siegfried retained a majority of his old moveset while Nightmare's new moveset became a brutish twist of Siegfried's moveset. Nightmare's moveset relies far less on stances and mindgames and focuses more on overwhelming the opponent with strong blows and otherworldly might. As such, Siegfried is seen as a technical stance character focused on mindgames and mix ups while Nightmare is an aggressive rushdown character focused on punishing his opponent's mistakes with his raw power. Despite Soulcalibur VI being a reboot that takes place during the events of Soulcalibur, Nightmare and Siegfried retain these differences in their movesets.

Derived characters

Inferno 

Inferno is the physical manifestation of the cursed sword Soul Edge's own soul and the true antagonist within Soul series, where it mostly started out as the final boss in Soul Edge (originally listed as "SoulEdge") until Soulcalibur II, including the reboot/retelling game Soulcalibur VI. It fights using the attack style of other fighters from its memories of past battles and will switch to a random one at the start of each round. Though it exists in its own dimension, Astral Chaos (a realm where time and space never exist), it has used duplicity such as in the case of tricking Siegfried into expanding its will, and in more extreme cases utilized Cervantes' flaming corpse and later the remnants of Nightmare's armor to create an avatar for itself. Within Astral Chaos, Inferno can manifest itself as a flaming and mostly skeletal body for itself, creating weapons to match whichever fighting style it currently uses, particularly Siegfried's being its primary likeness at most part.

Inferno, along with Soul Edge is destroyed by Siegfried at the end of Soulcalibur IV, though its will continues to live in the leftover shards of Soul Edge and later manifests itself in a new Soul Edge. However, after the new Nightmare was slain, Inferno choose Pyrrha as its new host until being defeated by her brother and Soul Edge along with Soul Calibur were both sealed away in the astral chaos. Its will and power has, directly and indirectly, affected several other characters in the series, such as the Evil Seed event that caused many to turn somewhat evil or insane. It has also caused the creation of several life forms or modification of them, such as Ivy's sword, Charade, Necrid and Abyss.

In Soulcalibur VI, Inferno's gameplay is similar to his original Soul Edge counterpart, as being more of an enhanced version of certain Soul Edge wielders than as a mimic fighter; in this case, its main alter-ego Nightmare instead of Cervantes. Due to his final boss role despite being an unlockable character, Inferno is banned from online matches and official tournaments.

Night Terror 
 is the secret final boss of Soulcalibur III, replacing the normal final boss Abyss if certain requirements are met. Its appearance has been a mystery as it is not player-controllable, is given very little mention in-game (its profile only stated that it is the result of Soul Edge and Soul Calibur fusing with Nightmare's remains), and does not appear or mentioned in future games. The official artbook of Soulcalibur V mentions the creature as the personification of "Catastrophe" residing in Astral Chaos who is so powerful that even Soul Calibur's creator, Algol, avoids confronting it.

Night Terror utilizes a complete version of Soul Edge as its weapon with a fighting style simply referred to as "Memories of Nightmare?". It borrows many moves from Nightmare, albeit greatly amplified, including having greater range and power or becoming unblockable. Notably, Night Terror is the only character in the history of the series who cannot be defeated by ring outs; whenever it is knocked off the stage, it simply flies back using its wings.

Reception
Siegfried's overall reception in the series has been positive. Outlets such as Eurogamer, Gameplanet and GamesRadar commented positively on his redesigns for Soulcalibur IV, and Soulcalibur VI. IGN has too praised Siegfied for an appealing design and a powerful yet graceful fighting style while listing him together with Nightmare at a top of their top ten list for the series in 2008, where they both were called "a perfect representation of the series' core conflict," and opining that "a Soul game simply feels incomplete without an appearance by the warring personalities of Siegfried and Nightmare." In 2013, Complex ranked Siegfried/Nightmare the best character in the series, citing his duality as the reason that makes the character "one of the most fascinating characters in the entire series." In a preview of Soulcalibur V, Siliconera said the franchise would not be same without Siegfried or Nightmare. The Gamer listed him as the 12th most powerful Soulcalibur character in 2017, praising his role and impact in the series.

GameAxis Unwired expressed mixed thoughts about the character in Legends due to the fact he is the only playable character at first as the rest are unlockable. Additionally, the lack of his relationship with Nightmare not being featured as usual earned criticism. Expressing disappointment by the lack of famous characters in Soulcalibur V, GameSpy noted that at least Siegfried's return might at least encourage him to play the game, citing lack of interest with the new cast.

Nightmare has received praise both as an aspect of Siegfried and as a series villain, and has been described as "one of the most memorable fighting-game villains in history." The New York Times noted his size and appearance alongside Astaroth's as standouts in the series, adding "they offer characters made for the sort of player who would have preferred Sonny Liston to Muhammad Ali, or Shaquille O'Neal to Michael Jordan." Others have been critical of the character's strength, such as JIVE Magazine which described him as one of several "total crutches for mediocre players" in Soulcalibur II.

Nightmare placed first in UGO.com's "Top 11 SoulCalibur Fighters" article, with the writers statement "Was there ever really any question? Not for us..." and praise for his strength and role as a "badass, playable villain." IGN listed him as a character they wished to see in Super Smash Bros. Brawl as a playable guest villain, though noted he was also "too extreme" for the series. In a later article on the Soul series itself, they noted "a Soul game simply feels incomplete without an appearance by the warring personalities of Siegfried and Nightmare", and praised the contrast between Siegfried's angelic figure and Nightmare's demonic form. In Game Informers 2009 list of best fighting game characters, Nightmare placed second.

In a 2002 poll by Namco prior to the release of Soulcalibur II regarding their favorite character, Siegfried placed ninth with 2.5% of the tally, tied with Mitsurugi. In Bandai Namco's 2015 poll, Siegfried was voted the sixth most popular characters from the series, followed by Nightmare.

See also
List of Soulcalibur characters

References

Demon characters in video games
Fantasy video game characters
Fictional criminals in video games
Fictional duos
Fictional people of the Holy Roman Empire
Fictional German people in video games
Fictional characters who have made pacts with devils
Fictional characters with dissociative identity disorder
Fictional knights in video games
Fictional mass murderers
Fictional mercenaries in video games
Fictional outlaws
Fictional patricides
Fictional swordfighters in video games
Fictional warlords in video games
Ghost characters in video games
Male characters in video games
Namco antagonists
Namco protagonists
Orphan characters in video games
Soulcalibur series characters
Video games about spirit possession
Video game bosses
Video game characters introduced in 1995
Video game characters with ice or cold abilities